The women's 50 metre freestyle S13 event at the 2022 Commonwealth Games was held on 30 July at the Sandwell Aquatics Centre.

Results

Final

References

Women's 50 metre freestyle S13